Joan Carles Camp Areny (born March 21, 1962) is a current member of the General Council of Andorra.

References 

Living people
1962 births
Members of the General Council (Andorra) 2019-present